Isis most commonly refers to the Egyptian goddess Isis, or as an acronym for the Islamic State of Iraq and Syria.

Isis or ISIS may also refer to:

Computing
 ISIS (operating system), used on the Intel 8085 processor
 CDS ISIS, a non-numerical information storage and retrieval software developed by UNESCO
 Image and Scanner Interface Specification
 Infinitely Scalable Information Storage, a video storage system from Avid Technology
 Integrated Software for Imagers and Spectrometers, software to process data collected by NASA planetary missions
 IS-IS or ISIS, a network routing protocol
 ISIS/Draw, a chemistry modelling program 
 Softcard or Isis Mobile Wallet, a mobile payment system
 Unity ISIS, a storage device
 Integrated Scientific Information System, software programs including the MDL Chime plug-in
 ISIS, a variant of the JOSS programming language

Fictional characters
 Isis (Battlestar Galactica)
 Isis (Bluewater Comics)
 Isis (DC Comics)
 Isis (Marvel Comics)
 Isis (Stargate)

Music
 Isis (band), an American post-metal band
 Isis (horn-rock band), a 1970s all-female band
 Lin Que or Isis, a member of Deadly Venoms
 Isis (Lully), a 1677 opera
 "Isis" (song), a song by Bob Dylan
 "Isis", a song by Delta-S from Voyage to Isis
 "Isis", a song by the Yeah Yeah Yeahs from Is Is
 "ISIS" (Joyner Lucas song), a song by Joyner Lucas featuring Logic

Organizations
 Independent Schools Information Service
 Isis Innovation or Oxford University Innovation, a British technology transfer company
 ISIS Equity Partners or Livingbridge, a private equity firm headquartered in London
 HM Prison Isis, a young offenders institution in London
 Institute for Science and International Security, an American non-governmental institution
 Institute for the Scientific Investigation of Sexuality or the Family Research Institute, an American anti-gay organization
 Institute for the Secularisation of Islamic Society, an American organization
 International Society for Iranian Studies or the Association for Iranian Studies, a U.S.-based academic organization
 International Society for the Interdisciplinary Study of Symmetry
 International Species Information System or Species360, a zoo and aquarium software development and data-sharing organization
 ISIS Group or the Adara Group, an international development organisation dealing with issues of human trafficking
 Isis-Urania Temple, a religious group
 Innovative Solutions In Space, a Dutch aerospace company

Periodicals
 Isis (journal), a journal on the history of science, medicine and technology
 Isis magazine, a student magazine at Oxford University
 Isis, a periodical by Lorenz Oken

Places
 Isis (lunar crater)
 42 Isis, an asteroid
 Electoral district of Isis, in Queensland, Australia
 Shire of Isis, a former local government area Queensland, Australia
 Port of Isis, Bulhar
 Isis Highway, an Australian highway
 The Isis, the upper part of the River Thames in Oxford, UK
 Isis Bridge, across the River Thames near Oxford, UK
 Isis, Ohio, an unincorporated community
 Isis Temple, a prominence in the Grand Canyon in the United States

Science
 42 Isis, an asteroid
 Isis (genus), a soft coral genus
 ISIS (satellite), a series of Canadian satellites
 Hippotion isis, a species of moth
 International Studies of Infarct Survival, a set of clinical trials
 ISIS neutron source, a pulsed neutron and muon source
 ISIS, alternate abbreviation for IS☉IS, an instrument aboard the Parker Solar Probe spacecraft to Earth's Sun

Ships
 Isis (ship), a grain ship of Ancient Rome, described by Lucian
 HMS Isis (1774), a 50-gun fourth rate
 HMS Isis (1819), a 50-gun fourth rate
 HMS Isis (1896), an Eclipse-class protected cruiser
 HMS Isis (D87), an I-class destroyer launched in 1936
 HMS Isis (M2010), a Ley-class minehunter launched in 1955 as HMS Cradley
 USC&GS Isis, an early 20th-century survey ship

Sports
 Isis Waterski Club
 Isis, an Oxford University reserve rowing crew at the Boat Race

Television
 Isis (TV series) or The Secrets of Isis
 "Isis", an episode of Smallville
 Project Isis (Chuck), a fictional spy operation in Chuck
 International Secret Intelligence Service, a fictional spy agency in Archer

Transportation
 Integrated Sensor is Structure, a project to develop an airship for intelligence use
 Integrated standby instrument system, a backup instrument display for aircraft
 ISIS Drive or International Splined Interface Standard, a bicycle bottom bracket interface specification
 Morris Isis, a car by Morris Motors from 1929 to 1931 and a car from the British Motor Corporation in the 1950s
 Toyota Isis, a seven-seat large MPV

Other uses
 Isis (given name)
 Integrated Secure Identification System
 Isis District State High School
 "Isis" of the Suebi, a goddess in the first-century book Germania
 Is, is or isis, an English sentence with the word "is" twice in succession
 Tropical Storm Isis, six tropical cyclones worldwide have been named Isis.

See also
 HMS Isis, a list of British Royal Navy ships
 ISI (disambiguation)
 Isis Eaglet, a character in Magical Chronicle Lyrical Nanoha Force
 Isis River (disambiguation), any of several rivers
 Tropical Storm Isis, a name formerly used for Pacific hurricanes
 Isyss, an R&B group
 Mysteries of Isis, religious initiation rites performed in the Greco-Roman world
 Name changes due to the Islamic State of Iraq and the Levant
 Names of the Islamic State of Iraq and the Levant
 ISIS-KP, or the Islamic State of Iraq and the Levant – Khorasan Province, an offshoot of the ISIS operating primarily in  Afghanistan and South-East Asia